Vinterviken ("Winter-cove") is a bay in  the Mälaren lake in southern Stockholm, Sweden. Vinterviken is located in a valley surrounded by the Gröndal and Aspudden suburb areas. The origin of the name Vinterviken can be traced back to the 17th century. Back then a common winter route (on the lake ice) used to go from Fittja and the Mälaren islands, and entered the city through Vinterviken and lake Trehörningen (nowadays named Trekanten).

Historical and cultural area 
During its history, Vinterviken has transformed from a vital industrial area to a recreational region. The most important stage was when Alfred Nobel, a Swedish chemist, established his new research laboratory and factory there. In his Vinterviken laboratory, Nobel invented an enormous revolution for armaments and explosive manufacturing, dynamite.

Alfred Nobel’s factory  

Nobel bought the whole area of Vinterviken in 1865. Due to safety issues he moved his research lab and his factory (Nitroglycerin Aktiebolaget) from a populated area in Stockholm to Vinterviken which was surrounded by cliffs and therefore suitable for his dangerous experiments. Gradually, Nobel developed the area by constructing a local rail-road, a harbour, testing grounds/tunnels (Nobels spränggropar) for exploring dynamite and also, housing for factory workers. Dynamite used to be manufactured in this area until 1921 but Nobel's factory remained working until the 1980s.

Recreation area 

Since 1974 Stockholm city owns the Vinterviken region and by renovating this area has converted it from an industrial place to a public recreational area.  A major reconstruction in the beginning of the 1990s provided the park with sculptures, walking paths, small gardens, restaurants and a cafe. One of the Nobel factory buildings has become a banquet hall called Winterviken. In the area are several places to swim among cliffs and pebbled shores. Vinterviken park also offers boating and canoeing services.

Environmental pollution 

The industrial activities in the Vinterviken since the 1860s have led to severe soil contamination in the area, with high levels of lead and arsenic. It was ranked in 2011 by the City of Stockholm as the ninth most polluted area in the city.

Unusually high levels of uranium have also been detected in the cove's bottom sediment, likely owing to the activities of a nuclear technology company which was previously residing in the area; however, the actual levels of radioactivity are considered low enough not to be considered a health risk.

Vinterviken through history 

Vinterviken:

References

External links
 "SWEDEN.SE - the Official Gateway to Sweden." SWEDEN.SE. N.p., n.d. Web. 17 June 2012. <http://www.sweden.se/eng/Home/>
 "Vinterviken." Vinterviken. N.p., n.d. Web. 17 June 2012. <https://web.archive.org/web/20100815030732/http://www.vinterviken-nobel.se/sid2.html>.
 "Ponderings over the Pond." : Alfred Nobel in Vinterviken. N.p., n.d. Web. 17 June 2012. <http://pondpond.blogspot.se/2007/10/alfred-nobel-in-vinterviken-blast-from.html>
 "Ateljéföreningen Vinterviken, Konst, Måleri, Skulptur, Alfred Nobel." Ateljéföreningen Vinterviken, Konst, Måleri, Skulptur, Alfred Nobel. N.p., n.d. Web. 17 June 2012. <http://www.vinterviken.nu/>.
 "Winterviken – Med Plats För Många." Winterviken. N.p., n.d. Web. 17 June 2012. <http://www.winterviken.se/>.

Geography of Stockholm
Landforms of Stockholm County
Bays of Sweden